Jean-Pierre Dufau (born 5 July 1943 in Capbreton) was a member of the National Assembly of France.  He represented Landes's 2nd constituency from 1997 to 2017 as a member of the Socialiste, radical, citoyen et divers gauche.

References

1943 births
Living people
People from Landes (department)
Socialist Party (France) politicians
Deputies of the 11th National Assembly of the French Fifth Republic
Deputies of the 12th National Assembly of the French Fifth Republic
Deputies of the 13th National Assembly of the French Fifth Republic
Deputies of the 14th National Assembly of the French Fifth Republic
Politicians from Nouvelle-Aquitaine